In enzymology, a phosphoethanolamine N-methyltransferase is an enzyme that catalyzes the chemical reaction

S-adenosyl-L-methionine + ethanolamine phosphate  S-adenosyl-L-homocysteine + N-methylethanolamine phosphate

Thus, the two substrates of this enzyme are S-adenosyl methionine and ethanolamine phosphate, whereas its two products are S-adenosylhomocysteine and N-methylethanolamine phosphate.

This enzyme belongs to the family of transferases, specifically those transferring one-carbon group methyltransferases.  The systematic name of this enzyme class is S-adenosyl-L-methionine:ethanolamine-phosphate N-methyltransferase. This enzyme is also called phosphoethanolamine methyltransferase.  This enzyme participates in glycerophospholipid metabolism.

References 

 

EC 2.1.1
Enzymes of unknown structure